Simon Olof Kaijser (born November 18, 1969 in Danderyd, Sweden) is a Swedish film director.

Selected filmography

Director
2002 – Skeppsholmen (TV drama) (Director: 10 episodes)
2004 – Allrams höjdarpaket (Allram's Top-Notch Parcel) (TV Christmas calendar) (Director: 11 episodes)
2005 – Coachen (TV thriller) (3 episodes) 
2007 – En riktig jul (A Real Christmas) (TV Christmas calendar), 24 episodes 
2007 – Höök (TV thriller) (Ep. 10-12) ("Beskyddarna")  
2009 – De halvt dolda (TV drama) (4 episodes) 
2011 – Stockholm Östra 
2012 – Don't Ever Wipe Tears Without Gloves (TV drama) 
2015 – Life in Squares (TV drama) (BBC)
2017 - Innan vi dör (TV Thriller) 
2018 – Spinning Man (film)
2019 - Innan vi Dör (TV Thriller)

External links

Swedish Film Database

Swedish film directors
1969 births
Living people